Robert LeRoy Clodius (March 10, 1921 – April 2, 2014) was an American educator and acting President of University of Wisconsin–Madison in 1970.

Born in Walla Walla, Washington, Clodius went to Whitman College. He then served in the United States Navy during World War II and went to officers school at Northwestern University. He then graduated from University of California, Berkeley. He then taught agricultural economics at University of Wisconsin–Madison and was vice president and then acting president in 1970. He retired in 1990. In 2000, Clodius and his wife moved to Rockford, Illinois where he died.

Notes

1921 births
2014 deaths
People from Walla Walla, Washington
People from Rockford, Illinois
People from Madison, Wisconsin
Whitman College alumni
Northwestern University alumni
University of California, Berkeley alumni
University of Wisconsin–Madison faculty
Leaders of the University of Wisconsin-Madison
United States Navy personnel of World War II